The Serpent and the Rainbow is a 1988 American horror film directed by Wes Craven and starring Bill Pullman. The script by Richard Maxwell and Adam Rodman is loosely based on the non-fiction book of the same name by ethnobotanist Wade Davis, wherein Davis recounted his experiences in Haiti investigating the story of Clairvius Narcisse, who was allegedly poisoned, buried alive, and revived with an herbal brew which produced what was called a zombie.

Plot
In 1978, a Haitian man named Christophe mysteriously dies in a French missionary clinic, while a voodoo parade marches past his window. The next morning, Christophe is buried in a traditional Catholic funeral. A mysterious man dressed in a suit who was outside Christophe's hospital window on the night he died is in attendance. As the coffin is lowered into the ground, Christophe's eyes open and tears roll down his cheeks.

Seven years later, Harvard anthropologist Dennis Alan is in the Amazon rainforest studying rare herbs and medicines with a local shaman. He drinks a potion and experiences a hallucination of the same black man from Christophe's funeral, surrounded by corpses in a bottomless pit.

Back in Boston, Alan is approached by a pharmaceutical company looking to investigate a drug used in Haitian Vodou to create zombies. The company wants Alan to acquire the drug for use as a "super anesthetic". The corporation provides Alan with funding and sends him to Haiti, which is in the middle of a revolution. Alan's exploration in Haiti, assisted by Dr. Marielle Duchamp, locates Christophe who is alive after having been buried seven years earlier. Alan is taken into custody, and the commander of the Tonton Macoute, Captain Dargent Peytraud–the same man from Christophe's funeral and Alan's vision in the Amazon–warns Alan to leave Haiti.

Continuing his investigation, Alan finds a local man, Mozart, who is reported to have knowledge of the procedure for creating the zombie drug. Alan pays Mozart for a sample, but Mozart sells him rat poison instead. After embarrassing Mozart in public, Alan convinces Mozart to show Alan how to produce the drug for a fee of $1,000. Alan is arrested again by the Tonton Macoutes, and tortured by having a nail driven through his scrotum, and then dumped on a street with the message that he must leave Haiti or be killed. Alan again refuses to leave and meets with Mozart to create the drug.

Alan has a nightmare of Peytraud, revealed to be a bokor who turns enemies into zombies and steals their souls. When Alan wakes up, he is lying next to Christophe's sister who has been decapitated. The Tonton Macoutes enter, take photos, and frame Alan for murder. Peytraud tells Alan to leave the country and never return, lest he be convicted of the murder, executed, and then his soul stolen by Peytraud. Peytraud puts Alan on a US bound plane, but Mozart sneaks on board and gives Alan the zombie drug. Mozart asks Alan to tell people about him, so that Mozart can achieve international fame. Alan agrees and returns to Boston with his mission apparently completed.

At a celebration dinner, the wife of Alan's employer is possessed by Peytraud, who warns Alan of his own imminent death. Alan returns to Haiti, where his only ally, a houngan named Lucien Celine, is killed by Peytraud and Mozart is beheaded as a sacrifice for Peytraud's power. Alan is then sprayed with the zombie powder and dies; later, Peytraud steals Alan's body from the hospital before the death can be reported to the US Embassy. Peytraud takes Alan to a graveyard where, helpless in his coffin, Alan sees that Peytraud has captured Marielle and will sacrifice her. Peytraud shows Alan Celine's soul in a canari. Alan is then buried alive with a tarantula to "keep him company". Waking up in his coffin a few hours later, Alan is rescued by Christophe who was also turned into a zombie by Peytraud.

Having escaped Peytraud's trap, Alan returns to the Tonton Macoute headquarters looking for Marielle. There, Alan defeats Peytraud through a battles of wills, using Celine's white magic to drive a nail into Peytraud's groin, and sends his soul to hell. As the Haitian people celebrate the downfall of Jean-Claude Duvalier, Marielle proclaims "The nightmare is over".

Cast
 Bill Pullman as Dr. Dennis Alan
 Cathy Tyson as Dr. Marielle Duchamp
 Zakes Mokae as Dargent Peytraud
 Paul Winfield as Lucien Celine
 Brent Jennings as Louis Mozart
 Conrad Roberts as Christophe Durand
 Aleta Mitchell as Celestine Durand
 Badja Djola as Lieutenant Gaston
 Michael Gough as Dr. Earl "Schoonie" Schoonbacher
 Paul Guilfoyle as Dr. Andrew Cassedy
 Dey Young as Deborah Cassedy
 Luis Tavare Pesquera as Kyle Cassedy
 William Newman as French Missionary Doctor
 Francis Guinan as American Doctor
 Jaime Pina Gautier as Julio, Dennis' Helicopter Pilot
 Philogen Thomas as Priest
 Evencio Mosquera Slaco as Old Shaman

Production

The Serpent and the Rainbow was filmed in Boston, Massachusetts, Santo Domingo in the Dominican Republic, and in Haiti. During production in Haiti, the local government informed the cast and crew that they could not guarantee their safety for the remainder of the film's shoot because of the political strife and civil turmoil that was occurring during that time; as a result, production was relocated to the Dominican Republic for the remainder of the shoot.

Release

Rating
In an interview, Craven stated that unlike his previous films that had problems with the Motion Picture Association of America, the first cut got an R rating without any problems. According to an article from Fangoria #71, the original cut was 184 minutes long but Craven felt that it was too long and talky so he cut it down to 98 minutes. It was then test screened to the audience and their reactions were favorable.

Box office
The Serpent and the Rainbow was released theatrically in the United States by Universal Pictures on February 5, 1988. It grossed $19,595,031 at the box office.

Critical reception

On review aggregator Rotten Tomatoes, The Serpent and the Rainbow holds an approval rating of 63%, based on 35 reviews, and an average rating of 5.8/10. Its consensus reads, "Although it's occasionally overwhelmed by excessive special effects, The Serpent and the Rainbow draws on a chilling atmosphere to deliver [an] intelligent, politically informed story." On Metacritic, the film has a weighted average score of 64 out of 100, based on 13 critics, indicating "generally favorable reviews".

Roger Ebert of the Chicago Sun-Times gave the movie three stars out of a possible four, praising Pullman's performance and the "stunning" visuals, while also noting The Serpent and the Rainbow seemed to take Haitain voodoo more seriously as a religion and cultural force than most horror movies with similar themes, which merely use voodoo as a "gimmick".

Home media
The film was first released on DVD by Image Entertainment in 1998, though this version is now out of print. It was subsequently re-released by Universal Studios in 2003 and in 2016 on Blu-ray from Scream Factory.

See also

 List of films featuring hallucinogens

References

External links
 
 
 
 
  
 
 Zombie Powder

1988 horror films
1988 films
American supernatural horror films
1980s English-language films
Films directed by Wes Craven
Fiction about Haitian Vodou
Horror films based on actual events
American zombie films
Folk horror films
Films based on non-fiction books
Films set in Haiti
Films shot in the Dominican Republic
Films about Latin American military dictatorships
Universal Pictures films
Films about Voodoo
Films scored by Brad Fiedel
Films set in 1978
Films set in 1988
Films shot in Boston
Films shot in Haiti
Grave-robbing in film
1980s American films